Leonel Alves is a name. People with that name include:

 Leonel Alves (footballer, born 1988), Portuguese-born Bissau-Guinean footballer
 Leonel Alves (footballer, born 1993), Andorran footballer

Alves, Leonel